A diversionary foreign policy, or a diversionary war, is an international relations term that identifies a war instigated by a country's leader in order to distract its population from their own domestic strife. The concept stems from the Diversionary War Theory, which states that leaders who are threatened by domestic turmoil may initiate an international conflict in order to improve their standing. There are two primary mechanisms behind diversionary war: a manipulation of the Rally Round the Flag Syndrome effect, causing an increase of national fervor from the general public, and "gambling on resurrection", whereby a leader in a perilous domestic situation takes high-risk foreign policy decisions with small chance of success but with a high reward if successful.

Scholars of International Relations have dedicated much research to the practical application of diversionary war. A large percentage investigates Presidents of the United States and their disputed culpability partaking in diversionary foreign policy.
Despite the immense amount of effort and research, scholars have not yet formed a consensus of the accuracy of the theory, and empirical evidence is mixed at best.

Effects

Intended 
Generally, the pursuit of a diversionary foreign policy may offer the leader in power four benefits, all of which increase their ability to remain in power:
 A successful diversionary foreign policy could increase support for the domestic regime. This in turn increases that government's time to address their internal trouble.
 Artificial tension created from the international conflict may justify a leaders' suppression of dissent.
 The war abroad could cause the population to simply be distracted from the issues that induced the original dissatisfaction with the government.
 The external threat may unify the country through the Rally Round the Flag Syndrome effect by creating a new out-group other than the government for the population to direct its dissatisfaction.

Negative 
However, all of these benefits depend on success in the diversionary war that the government facing domestic strife incites. Failure in these international actions would backfire against the leader's initial intent. As a result, the leader would likely face more domestic strife, possibly hastening his or her loss of power.
Nevertheless, this possible negative effect is addressed in the Diversionary War Theory. The theory itself states that rational leaders facing a near inevitable removal from office become more likely to gamble on a risky diversionary war. If the existing dissatisfaction is prompting their removal from office, a diversionary foreign policy only leaves room for gain.

Evolution 
Although the theory was not officially addressed in academia until the past half-century, the benefits of a diversionary foreign policy had long been accepted by governments and others as conventional wisdom.

In 1956, Simmel and Lewis A. Coser both published work applying the in-group/out-group psychology hypothesis towards International Relations. Essentially, their work postulated that populations of nations increase their cohesion during times of conflict with an out-group (another nation, organization, etc.). This often includes rallying around the country's leader. As an example, President George W. Bush's approval ratings soared to 80% following the attacks on September 11, 2001. This type of response suggests that leaders have an incentive to manufacture conflict whenever they are in the need of a boost of popularity. However, a 2022 study found that, using similar logic, presidents receive similar approval boosts when terminating a conflict. This lessens the cynicism required for most theories of diversionary foreign policy and shows evidence of another tool presidents can, and may, use for diversionary purposes.

From this assertion, scholars have used this conventional wisdom to expand and test the theory's true applications. A significant number of studies have attempted to establish connections between the instigation of war as a way to divert attention from a struggling economy, or general low approval ratings. In addition, the theory has diverged into contemporary and traditional perspectives.

Conditions that lead to diversionary foreign policy 
The purpose of diversionary foreign policy is to divert the attention of the public away from domestic issues. This means that the conditions leading to diversionary tactics include any sort of domestic unrest. This incorporates dissatisfaction with domestic policies and poor economic conditions. The theory predicts that the use of external force will increase the chance of reelection, so it would be used during a time when the president does not seem to have a good chance of reelection. The necessary conditions of the opposing state differ based on which theory one ascribes to, traditional or contemporary. The traditional view of diversionary foreign policy suggests that a state will target another in which conflict is likely to be prolonged, which would be against states with comparable military capabilities. According to this point of view, the prospect of victory is not the most important aspect in choosing an enemy because it is based on a sociological "in-group/out-group" perspective. This refers to the increase of cohesion among the "in-group" because of the common enemy or "out-group". On the other hand, contemporary diversionary theory states that, due to the uncertainty of international relations and the high cost of war, a state is more likely to prey on a weaker state where victory will be more quickly and easily obtained.
Overall, diversionary foreign policy is more likely seen in a major power because they are less constrained by the international community. It is also seen more in democracies where the government needs to be more responsive to public sentiment.
Election cycles have a lot to do with diversionary wars because a war ideally increases the chance that the incumbent administration will remain.

Examples

Pre World War II

Hundred Years War 
In 1415, King Henry V of England invaded France shortly after his succession to the throne, resulting in a short campaign and a resounding victory at the Battle of Agincourt. This campaign initiated the third phase of the Hundred Years' War (1415–1453) termed the Lancastrian War.

Sir John Keegan has opined that the primary motivation for Henry's decision to invade France (ostensibly asserting, "on dubious legal grounds", a claim to the succession of the French throne), was to solidify his popularity at home and quell unrest from other English nobles, several of whom questioned the legitimacy of his dynasty, since his father, Henry IV, had usurped the throne from Richard II.

Russo-Japanese War 
One historical example that demonstrates the conventional acceptance of the effectiveness of a diversionary war is the Russo-Japanese War of 1904. During the months leading up war, Russia experienced numerous workers strikes that lead to internal unsettledness. These strikes coincided with the Russian's negotiations with the Japanese over expansion in Manchuria and Korea. It has been argued that, as a way to distract their population, the Russian Tzar and his ministers decided to goad the Japanese into declaring war, thereby turning Japan into the needed out-group. In fact, Russia's Minister of the Interior, Vyacheslav von Plehve, stated before starting the war:What this country needs is a short victorious war to stem the tide of revolution.

Clearly, at least some of the Russians in power at the time believed that by a diversionary war, they would be able to distract their population from the domestic troubles that had been haunting Russia. However, there is some evidence that the Tsar himself, and some of his advisors, did not believe that, being viewed as overmatched, Japan would be willing to go to war, and intended to use only the threat of such a conflict as a diversionary tactic.

However, the Russo-Japanese War is also in example of how a diversionary war can backfire. Japan soundly defeated Russia in battle. This only aggravated the calls for replacing the Tzar, loosened the Tzar's grip on power, and some say hastened the path toward the Russian Revolutions of 1905 and 1917.

French Revolutionary Wars of 1792 
In 1792, the French Government comprised a newly formed National Assembly, which had replaced King Louis XVI. In order to unify its citizens under the new flag and new leadership, the National Assembly began the French Revolutionary Wars. It first declared war on Austria, soon to be joined by Prussia.

Franco-Prussian War 
Otto von Bismarck utilized diversionary foreign policy often during his quest to unify Germany. These wars distracted the German people from the cultural differences that previously had prevented them from forming a single country. Bismarck used the success of the Franco-Prussian War in a similar fashion, officially establishing a German Empire following the siege of Paris.

Post-World War II 
Many contemporary examples involve the U.S. because they fit the mold of conditions, a democratic superpower. The examples follow a similar model in which the U.S. must decide whether or not to intervene in an international conflict. Because the U.S. is in a good position to win most military conflicts, it will most likely increase the current administration's chance of reelection if they engage in military conflict.

Falklands War 
It has been alleged that the National Reorganization Process, the ruling military government of Argentina, started the Falklands War (1982) to divert public attention from the country's chronic economic problems and the regime's ongoing human rights violations of the Dirty War. Numerous studies dispute that the Argentinian leadership was motivated by diversionary theory.

Russia's invasion of Crimea 
A 2017 study in the journal Security Studies found that Russia's seizure of Crimea in early 2014 "increased national pride among Russians while support for President Vladimir Putin rose dramatically, and they suggest that the two processes were causally linked."

Impact on international relation approaches

Challenges to realism and liberalism 
The focus of the Diversionary War theory on individual state actors and their domestic situations as causes for war challenges the basis of major approaches to International Relations. Many of these International Relation theories used by scholars, such as liberalism and realism, focus on states as the main actors in the international system. Technically, this is referred to as using the interstate level of analysis. These scholars attribute the motives and actions of states to the states themselves, instead of the decision makers inside their governments.

On the other hand, the use of diversionary foreign policy suggests that factors inside of a state, such as domestic disputes and economic lows, have as much of an impact on foreign policy as national interests. As a result, examinations of the use of diversionary wars shift the study of International Relations away from the interstate level of analysis, toward the domestic level of analysis, and even the individual level of analysis. In fact, many critics of realism use examples of the use of diversionary wars as a means to discredit the theory. However, modern approaches to realism, such as neoclassical realism, regard domestic politics as a crucial variable in foreign policy. This means the diversionary foreign policy thesis does in fact fit within the neoclassical realist framework.

Criticism and problems with the theory 
As with most theories there are disagreements among experts regarding diversionary wars. Diversionary foreign policy is supported by anecdotal evidence because it is hard to prove a theory in international relations quantitatively. When quantitative or empirical tests are attempted, the results are fairly ambiguous and there is not enough consistency among various findings to establish a definitive conclusion  This creates a discrepancy between the theoretical and historical text and the empirical evidence. Therefore, a good amount of criticism arises.

To begin with, there is an opposing theory that argues a state leader has the most leverage when citizens are content with domestic policy and he has high public approval ratings. It is then assumed that leaders are most likely to engage in international conflicts when the domestic approval is highest. Furthermore, some analysts argue that the entire basis for the argument, the idea that a foreign enemy brings a country together, is not as well founded as it originally seems. This idea relies heavily on sociological studies that focus on the cohesion of small groups. Problems arise when theorists try to apply this to a large group such as a nation state, which is composed of many smaller groups. In fact, there are examples of external conflict leading to more unrest between domestic groups. For example, World War I led to internal problems in Russia, eventually culminating in the Bolshevik Revolution Some also argue that a government cannot just incite an international conflict whenever they wish. Although there are always conflicts going on among the international community, not all are compelling enough to justify the use of force to the public and the government may even be accused of overreacting to a situation.

See also 
 Credibility gap
 Realpolitik

Notes

References 

 Baker, William D. "Strategic Insights – Presidential Uses of Force and the Diversionary Theory of War." CCC – Center for Contemporary Conflict. 20 Oct. 2008 <https://web.archive.org/web/20081020065956/http://www.ccc.nps.navy.mil/si/2004/may/bakerMay04.asp>.
 Burbach, David T. "Diversionary Temptations: Presidential Incentives and the Political Use of Force." MIT.edu. 20 Oct. 2008 <stuff.mit.edu/people/dburbach/burbach_diss_intro.pdf>.
 Cashman, Gregg. What Causes War? An Introduction to Theories of International Conflict. Salisbury, MD: Lexington Books, 1999.
 Chapman, Terrence L. "The United Nations Security Council and the Rally 'Round the Flag Effect." The Journal of Conflict Resolution 48.6 (2004): 886–909. American University. 20 Oct. 2008. .
 Chiozza, Giacomo. "Peace through Insecurity: Tenure and International Conflict." The Journal of Conflict Resolution 47.4 (2003): 443–467. American University. 20 Oct. 2008. .
 DeRouen, Karl. "Presidents and the Diversionary Use of Force: A Research Note." International Studies Quarterly 44.2 (2000): 317–328. American University. 20 Oct. 2008. .
 Foster, Dennis. "Relative Capabilities and American Diversionary Targeting Decisions" Paper presented at the annual meeting of the Midwest Political Science Association, Palmer House Hilton, Chicago, Illinois, Apr 15, 2004
 Hess, George D. "War and Democracy." The Journal of Political Economy 109.4 (2001): 776–810. American University. 20 Oct. 2008. .
 Kowner, Rotem. Historical Dictionary of the Russo-Japanese War. Lantham, MD: The Scarecrow Press, 2006.
 Meernik, James. The Myth of the Diversionary Use of Force by American presidents. Political Research Quarterly, Vol. 49, No. 3 (Sep., 1996), pp. 573–590 Sage Publications, Inc. on behalf of the University of Utah
 Miller, Ross A. "Regime Type, Strategic Interaction, and the Diversionary Use of Force." The Journal of Conflict Resolution 43.3 (1999): 388–402. American University. 20 Oct. 2008. .
 Miller, Ross A. "American Journal of Political Science." Domestic Structures and the Diversionary Use of Force 39.3 (1998): 760–785. American University. 20 Oct. 2008. .
 Mitchell, Sara McLaughlin. "Rivalry and Diversionary Use of Force." The Journal of Conflict Resolution 48.6 (2004): 937–961. American University. 20 Oct. 2008. .
 Morgan, Clifton, Diana Richards, Val Schwebach, Rick Wilson, and Garry Young. "Good Times, Bad Times, and the Diversionary Use of Force: A Tale of Some Not-So-Free Agents." The Journal of Conflict Resolution 37.3 (1993): 504–535. American University. 20 Oct. 2008. .
 Morgan, Clifton. "Domestic Support and Diversionary External Conflict in Great Britain, 1950–1992." The Journal of Politics 61.3 (1999): 799–814. American University. 20 Oct. 2008. .
 Mowle, Thomas S. "Worldviews in Foreign Policy: Realism Liberalism, and External Conflict." Political Psychology 24.3 (2003): 561–592. American University. 20 Oct. 2008. .
 Smith, Alastair. "Diversionary Foreign Policy in Democratic Systems." International Studies Quarterly 40.1 (1996): 133–153. American University. 20 Oct. 2008. .
 Sobek, David. "Rallying Around the Podesta: Testing Diversionary Theory Across Time." Journal of Peace Research 44.1 (2007): 29–45. 20 Oct. 2008 <http://jpr.sagepub.com/cgi/reprint/44/1/29>.
 Watman, Kenneth. The Relationship Between Regime Strength and the Propensity. Columbus: Ohio State University, 2003.

Causes of war
Foreign policy
International relations
War and politics